Jonas Andersson (born 1972) is a Swedish politician. He was a member of the Riksdag for the Sweden Democrats party. 

Andersson is a youth support worker, in particular working with adopted minors of immigrant backgrounds, and was also a lecturer of leisure studies at a community college in Skellefteå. He was elected as a member of the Riksdag during the 2018 Swedish general election. He is sometimes referred to as Jonas Andersson i Skellefteå to distinguish him from Jonas Andersson i Linghem (born 1989), another member of the Riksdag for the same party.

He stood down at the 2022 Swedish general election.

References

1972 births
Living people
Members of the Riksdag from the Sweden Democrats
Swedish educators

21st-century Swedish politicians
Members of the Riksdag 2018–2022